At the 2011 Pan Arab Games, the equestrian events were held at Aspire Zone in Doha, Qatar from 13–23 December. A total of 6 events were contested.

Medal summary

Open

Medal table

References

External links
Equestrian at official website 

Pan Arab Games
Events at the 2011 Pan Arab Games
2011 Pan Arab Games